The City of Preston was a local government area about  north-northeast of Melbourne, the state capital of Victoria, Australia.

History

Preston's first involvement in local government was part of the Epping Road District in 1854, which also included Northcote. In 1870, the Epping District was amalgamated with the Merriang, Whittlesea, Morang and Woodstock Road Districts, to form a very large Darebin Shire. These entities mostly ended up in the Cities of Broadmeadows and Whittlesea.

Preston was first incorporated as the Jika Jika Shire on 8 November 1871, which was renamed Preston on 11 September 1885. It became a borough on 14 March 1922, a town on 24 May 1922, and was proclaimed a city on 14 July 1926.

On 22 June 1994, the City of Preston was abolished, and along with the City of Northcote and parts of the City of Coburg, was merged into the City of Darebin.

Council meetings were held at Preston City Hall, at High Street and Gower Street, Preston. It is still used for the same purpose by the City of Darebin.

Wards

The City of Preston was subdivided into four wards, each electing three councillors:
 South East Ward
 South West Ward
 North East Ward
 North West Ward

Suburbs
 Bundoora (shared with the City of Whittlesea and the Shire of Diamond Valley)
 Kingsbury
 Preston*
 Reservoir

* Council seat.

Population

* Estimate in the 1958 Victorian Year Book.

References

External links
 Victorian Places - Preston

Preston
City of Darebin
1871 establishments in Australia
1994 disestablishments in Australia